Stephan Rauch is a Swiss curler and curling coach.

Teams

Record as a coach of national teams

References

External links

Living people
Swiss male curlers
Swiss curling coaches
Year of birth missing (living people)